Jonathan Law High School is a public high school located in Milford, Connecticut, United States. It serves about 1,000 students in grades 9–12 in the Milford Public Schools system.

History
The school was built in the 1960s to accommodate the increased student numbers caused by the baby-boom after World War II. It was named in honor of the 27th Governor of the Colony of Connecticut, Jonathan Law (August 6, 1674 – November 6, 1750). Until the 1970s, the Milford Public School System continued to include two public high schools, Milford High School in the central part of the city and Jonathan Law High School on the west end of the city, but shortly after the opening of a third, Joseph A. Foran High School on the east end of the city, Milford High School was closed and converted to accommodate municipal administrative offices due to the city's diminishing student numbers. The school mascot is a humanoid eagle, but male sports teams refer to themselves as the Lawmen.

About 
Students have many offerings of AP classes and college preparatory courses. The school offers grades 9–12 to students from West Shore Middle School and Harborside Middle School. It is located at 20 Lansdale Avenue in Milford,  a walkable distance from Walnut Beach and Route 1.

Sports 
Sports offered are:
 Softball
 Baseball
 Tennis (male and female)
 Cross country (male and Female)
 Football 
 Volleyball 
 Basketball (male and female)
 Swimming (male and female)
 Soccer (male and female)
 Wrestling (male and female)
 Ice Hockey (male and female)
 Male team co-operates with Joseph A. Foran High School and is known as the Milford Indians 
 Female team co-operates with Joseph A. Foran High School and Notre Dame in Fairfield 
 Outdoor track (male and female)
 Indoor track (male and female) 
 Lacrosse (male and female)
 Golf (male and female)
Sports teams participate in the CIAC and Southern Connecticut Conference.

Notable alumni
Doug Coby, racing driver

References

External links
 
 School district website

Buildings and structures in Milford, Connecticut
Schools in New Haven County, Connecticut
Public high schools in Connecticut
Educational institutions established in 1961
1961 establishments in Connecticut